Connecticut's 57th House of Representatives district elects one member of the Connecticut House of Representatives. It consists of the town of Ellington and part of East Windsor and has been represented by Democrat Jaime Foster since 2021.

Recent elections

2020

2018

2016

2014

2012

References

57